Hossein Martin Fazeli a.k.a. Naanaam is an Iranian film director  and poet. His films have won 39 international awards, and have been broadcast on networks such as CNN, SBS, ARTE and Canal+. He has shot on location in Iran, UAE, India, Czech Republic, Slovakia, Poland, Germany, Norway, France, UK, Canada and USA. In 2008, Fazeli was shortlisted by the prestigious Sundance Institute to take part in 2008 Sundance International Filmmakers Award. Fazeli has previously worked on media campaigns for organizations such as the UNDP, the European Commission and Nonviolence International on issues such as minority rights, women’s rights, racism and nonviolent struggle. Fazeli is committed to human rights and women's rights.

International awards (selected) 
 Special Award for Promoting Human Rights, Melbourne International Film Festival, Australia
 Audience Award, São Paulo International Short Film Festival, Brazil
 Youth Jury Award, Clermont-Ferrand Film Festival, France
 Best International Film Award, Cape Town World Cinema Festival, South Africa
 Bigas Luna Award for the Best Story, Reus Festival Europeu de Curtmetratges, Spain
 International Jury Award, Encounters International Film Festival, Bristol, UK
 Golden Cat Award, Izmir International Film Festival, Turkey
 Best Screenplay Award, Santiago International Film Festival, Chile
 Audience Award, Barcelona Independent Film Festival, Spain
 Best Screenplay Award, DaKino International Film Festival, Romania
 Best Film Award, Film Platform, Denmark

 Special Jury Award, Euroshort, Poland
 Honorable Mention, Black & White Audiovisual Festival, Portugal
 Best Screenplay, AFIA International Film Festival, Denmark
 Best Foreign Short, Naoussa International Film and Video Festival, Greece
 Best Film Award, Bianco International Film Festival, Italy
 Best Director Award, San Giò Verona Video Festival, Italy
 Ovidiu Bose Pastina Special Award, Anonimul International Independent Film Festival, Romania
 Grand Prize, Cinefiesta International Film Festival, Puerto Rico
 Award for Extraordinary Achievement, Concorto International Film Festival, Italy
 Best Screenplay Award, Sedicidorto International Film Festival, Italy
 Best Film Award, Belgrade International Film Festival, Serbia
 Grand Calpurnia Award, Ourense Independent Film Festival, Spain
 Jury Award, Castellinaria International Film Festival, Switzerland
 Best of the Best Award, Spokane International Film Festival, USA

Filmography

See also

 Orson Welles
 Fritz Lang
 Jean-Luc Godard
 Abbas Kiarostami
 Forough Farrokhzad

References

External links
 
 Director's Site
 P.O.V. Filmtidsskrift, Danish Journal of Film Studies
 Tricko (The T-Shirt)
 The Blind Man
 

Canadian documentary film directors
Canadian male screenwriters
Iranian documentary film directors
20th-century Iranian poets
Living people
1964 births
21st-century Iranian poets
21st-century Canadian screenwriters
21st-century Canadian male writers